The Islands of the Kimberley are a group of over 2,500 islands lying off the coast of the Kimberley region of Western Australia. The islands extend from the Western Australia–Northern Territory border in the east to just north of Broome in the west.

North-West Kimberley Islands 1970s survey
In 1971, 1972, 1973 a series of biological surveys were carried out.

1971 visit
The list is in the order of visits in August 1971.

 Middle Osborn
 Fenelon
 Borda
 South West Osborn
 Low rocks
 Sir Graham Moore
 Louis
 North Eclipse
 Augustus
 Darcy
 Champagny
 Uwins
 Commerson
 Coronation
 Bigge

Kimberley Islands Biological Survey
A biological survey of 22 of the islands was conducted between December 2006 and December 2010 by the Department of Environment and Conservation, traditional owners, the Australian Museum and the Western Australian Museum.

The partnership with the Kimberley Land Council is important as the islands sampled in this survey are covered by five native title claim groups: Balanggarra, Uunguu, Dambimangari, Mayala and Bardi Jawi. Traditional Owners have strong management rights to the islands through native title and Aboriginal Reserve tenure.

See also 
 

 Sortable_list_of_islands_of_Western_Australia

Notes

Further reading 

 
Kimberley coastline of Western Australia